Dancing to the Devil's Beat is a studio album by English band Strawbs.

Track listing

"Revenge (Can Be So Sweet)" (Dave Cousins, Chas Cronk)– 5:18
"Beneath the Angry Sky" (Cousins, Cronk) – 4:29
"Copenhagen" (Cousins, Cronk) – 4:46
"Pro Patria Suite" – 7:44
"Back Along (We Were Young) (Cousins)"
"All for Each Other (Cousins)"
"Home Is Where the Heart Was Ever" (Cousins, Oliver Wakeman)
"Where Silent Shadows Fall" (Cousins) – 5:45
"The Man Who Would Never Leave Grimsby" (Dave Lambert) – 5:01
"The Ballad of Jay and Rose Mary" (Cousins) – 4:17
"Dancing to the Devil's Beat" (Cousins) - 3:38
"Oh How She Changed 2009" (Cousins) – 4:21

Personnel
Strawbs
Dave Cousins – vocals, guitar, banjo
Dave Lambert – vocals, guitar
Chas Cronk – vocals, bass guitar, guitar, keyboards, programming
Rod Coombes – drums
Oliver Wakeman – piano, Hammond organ, keyboards, orchestrations

Additional personnel
Ian Cutler – fiddle
Vince Martin – harmonica
Stephen Mission – cornet
Keith Deary - cornet

and the congregation of St. Christopher-at-Cliffe

Release history

References

Dancing to the Devil's Beat on Strawbs website
Insert from CD WMCD 2045 Dancing to the Devil's Beat

2009 albums
Strawbs albums
Albums produced by Chris Tsangarides